Neotoxoptera, is a genus of aphid in the superfamily Aphidoidea in the order Hemiptera. It is a true bug and sucks sap from plants.

Species
Neotoxoptera abeliae Takahashi, 1965
Neotoxoptera formosana (Takahashi, 1921)
Neotoxoptera oliveri (Essig, 1935)
Neotoxoptera sungkangensis
Neotoxoptera violae (Pergande, 1900)
Neotoxoptera weigeliae
Neotoxoptera yasumatsui Sorin, 1971

References

Sternorrhyncha genera
Macrosiphini